Kateryna Kasper (born 1986) is a Ukrainian operatic soprano. A member of the Oper Frankfurt, she has appeared in major international opera houses. She has performed in recitals and recordings. Her broad repertory includes works from Cavalieri's Spiel von Seele und Körper to the premiere of Der goldene Drache by Péter Eötvös.

Career 
Kasper studied voice at the Prokofiev State Music Academy in Donetsk. After her bachelor exam, she continued her studies on a scholarship by the Deutscher Akademischer Austauschdienst at the Hochschule für Musik Nürnberg with Edith Wiens. When Wiens moved to New York City, Kasper completed her studies at the Musikhochschule Frankfurt with Hedwig Fassbender, graduating in 2014 with a master's degree and the concert exam. She made her debut at the Oper Frankfurt as Waldvogel in Wagner's Siegfried in 2012, in a production of the Ring cycle that was recorded. In 2013, she appeared as Anima in Cavalieri's Spiel von Seele und Körper, and a reviewer noted the lyrical quality of her voice.

Kasper has been a member of the Oper Frankfurt from the 2014/15 season, coming from the company's opera studio. She has performed there roles such as Tigrane in Handel's Radamisto, Susanna in Mozart's Le nozze di Figaro, Zerlina in his Don Giovanni, Nannetta in Verdi's Falstaff, Gretel in Humperdinck's Hänsel und Gretel, and Sophie in Der Rosenkavalier by Richard Strauss. In 2014, she appeared in the leading roles (Young woman / The little Chinese) in the premiere of Der goldene Drache by Péter Eötvös, with the composer conducting the Ensemble Modern. A reviewer noted that she mastered long lines bordering on the ecstatic, but also cat-like sounds when suffering from toothache, combined with lively acting. She appeared at the Los Angeles Opera as Belinda in Purcell's Dido and Aeneas that year, staged by Barrie Kosky, alongside Paula Murrihy as Dido and Liam Bonner as Aeneas. In 2015, again in Frankfurt, she was Antonida, the hero's daughter, in Mikhail Glinka's Iwan Sussanin in a production staged by Harry Kupfer. A reviewer wrote that she presented her first aria, longing for her beloved, with vocal intensity and convincing acting.

She was awarded first prize at the Mirjam Helin International Singing Competition in Helsinki in 2014. In 2018, she recorded the soprano part in Bach's St John Passion live with Raphaël Pichon conducting the Ensemble Pygmalion,  as the Evangelist and Tomáš Král as the vox Christi.

References

External links 
 
 Kateryna Kasper on Operabase
 Kateryna Kasper Bach Cantatas Website

Ukrainian operatic sopranos
Frankfurt University of Music and Performing Arts alumni
1986 births
Living people
Place of birth missing (living people)
21st-century German  women opera singers
21st-century Ukrainian singers